Tuukka Mäkelä (born 24 May 1982) is a Finnish professional ice hockey defenceman who currently plays for Val Pusteria Wolves of Serie A, the top tier ice hockey league in Italy.  He played for the team previously, during the 2012-2013 season.

Career statistics

Regular season and playoffs

International

References

External links

 Profile on Elite Prospects

Living people
HPK players
1982 births
Boston Bruins draft picks
Finnish ice hockey defencemen